Laurence Sulivan (1713–1786) was an Anglo-Irish politician, Member of Parliament first for Taunton in 1762 and then for Ashburton in 1768. He was also Chairman of the British East India Company.

Sulivan was born in Ireland and moved to work for the East India Company, returning to England in 1753 with a moderate fortune, which enabled him to purchase Ponsbourne Park in Hertfordshire in 1761. He was elected a Director of the East India Company for 1755–8, 1764–5, 1769–70, 1771–2, 1778–80 and 1783 to his death. He was Deputy Chairman for 1763–4, 1772–3, 1780–1 and Chairman for 1758–9, 1760-2 and 1781–2. 

He had married in India and had two sons. Ponsbourne passed to his son Stephen, who sold it in 1811. His grandson, Laurence Sulivan (1783–1866) was a philanthropist, statesman and Deputy Secretary at War.

References

1713 births
1786 deaths
Directors of the British East India Company
British East India Company people
Members of the Parliament of Great Britain for Ashburton
British MPs 1761–1768
British MPs 1768–1774
18th-century British people